Dominick Miserandino (born November 22, 1972) is an American entrepreneur, author and journalist. He is also the founder and executive editor of the TheCelebrityCafe.com online magazine which publishes celebrity interviews, travel stories, movie, CD, book reviews, contests and trivia games.

Career
As a recipient of the PCLI Phil Spahn Award, and Long Island Business News' 40-Under-40 award, he was President of the Press Club of Long Island's board from 2011 to 2014 (a chapter of the Society of Professional Journalists ). He was a member of the Society of Professional Journalists’ pro chapter and is currently the treasurer. He has also published two books on traveling that also highlight his sense of humor one of which is How to Survive Your First Year of Marriage by Traveling Mother-in-Laws, Shopping, and Baby Talk, Oh My!

References

Living people
1972 births
21st-century American businesspeople
American male journalists
Journalists from New York City
People from Brooklyn